Akkasaliga is a community of people residing in the state of Karnataka. Akkasaliga in the Kannada language means "the one who works gold"; in other words they were the traditional village goldsmiths. They have been passing on the tradition of jewellery making from gold and silver since ancient times. Each village which was relatively large had an Akkasaliga along with other communities who specialized in a single profession. This skill was passed on from generation to generation and stayed within the Akkasaliga families. Due to the advent of mass jewellery making by machines, the Akkasaligas have had to abandon their traditional profession and have taken up modern education.

External links
 Article

Kannada people